

Early Greek historians: "logographers"

 Acusilaus
 Amelesagoras
 Cadmus of Miletus
 Hecataeus of Miletus
 Hellanicus of Lesbos
 Pherecydes of Athens
 Stesimbrotos of Thasos
 Xanthus (historian)

Classical Greece

 Antiochus of Syracuse
 Callisthenes
 Cratippus of Athens
 Ctesias
 Dinon
 Duris of Samos
 Ephorus
 Eudemus of Rhodes
 Hellanicus of Lesbos
 Heracleides of Cyme
 Herodotus
 Philistus
 Theopompus
 Thucydides
 Xenophon
 Hellenica Oxyrhynchia

Hellenistic Greece

 Abydenus
 Aesopus (historian)
 Agatharchides
 Agathocles (writers)
 Alexander Polyhistor
 Anticlides
 Antipater
 Antisthenes of Rhodes
 Aratus of Sicyon
 Artapanus of Alexandria
 Berossus
 Callixenus of Rhodes
 Cleitarchus
 Craterus (historian)
 Ctesicles
 Deinias of Argos
 Demetrius the Chronographer
 Diyllus
 Duris of Samos
 Euphantus
 Eupolemus
 Hecataeus of Abdera
 Hegesander (historian)
 Hegesias of Magnesia
 Hippobotus
 Jason of Cyrene
 Leon of Pella
 Manetho
 Marsyas of Pella
 Marsyas of Philippi
 Menander of Ephesus
 Neanthes of Cyzicus
 Nicander
 Paeon of Amathus
 Palaephatus
 Philinus of Agrigentum
 Philochorus
 Philostephanus
 Phylarchus
 Polybius
 Posidonius
 Satyrus the Peripatetic
 Sosicrates
 Theopompus
 Timaeus (historian)

Roman Greece

 Gaius Acilius
 Acesander
 Alexander Lychnus
 Alexander Polyhistor
 Appian
 Arrian
 Zarmanochegas
 Caecilius of Calacte
 Callinicus (Sophist)
 Castor of Rhodes
 Dio Chrysostom
 Lucius Cincius Alimentus
 Criton of Heraclea
 Criton of Pieria
 Dexippus
 Cassius Dio
 Diocles of Peparethus
 Diodorus Siculus
 Dionysius of Halicarnassus
 Ephorus the Younger
 Herodian
 Hypsicrates (historian)
 Josephus
 Sextus Julius Africanus
 Memnon of Heraclea
 Nicias of Nicaea
 Nicolaus of Damascus
 Pamphile of Epidaurus
 Philo of Byblos
 Plutarch
 Polyaenus
 Polybius
 Posidonius
 Gaius Asinius Quadratus
 Strabo
 Thallus (historian)
 Theophanes of Mytilene

Byzantine Empire

Procopius
Chronicon (Eusebius)
Chronicon (Jerome)
Agathias

 
Hellenistic historiography
 
Greek
Historiographers